In molecular biology, the copper type II ascorbate-dependent monooxygenases are a class of enzymes that require copper as a cofactor and which use ascorbate as an electron donor. This family contains two related enzymes, dopamine beta-monooxygenase  and peptidylglycine alpha-amidating monooxygenase . There are a few regions of sequence similarities between these two enzymes, two of these regions contain clusters of conserved histidine residues which are most probably involved in binding copper.

References

External links 
 

Protein domains